Rafael Zornoza Boy (born 31 July 1949) is a Spanish Catholic priest who is the bishop of the Diocese of Cádiz y Ceuta since 2011.

Biography
Born in Madrid as the third of six children, Zornoza studied at the Piarist School of Madrid alongside studying music and piano at the Madrid Royal Conservatory. After attending the Minor Seminary of Madrid, he studied at the Conciliar Seminary of Madrid from 1969 to 1974, graduating with a theology degree. He has a degree in Biblical theology from the Comillas Pontifical University. He has been noted for his support of youth outreach and culture.

Zornoza was ordained as a priest in the Archdiocese of Madrid on 19 March 1975 in Madrid, where he was the vicar of the Parish of Saint George before becoming a parish priest in 1983. In 1991, he became a private secretary to the first diocese of the new Diocese of Getafe, created from part of the Madrid diocese. He founded the new diocese's seminary in 1992, and served as its rector from 1994 to 2010.

On 5 February 2006, Zornoza was ordained by Pope Benedict XVI as titular bishop of Mentesa, and auxiliary bishop of Getafe. The same pontiff named him bishop of the Diocese of Cádiz y Ceuta  on 30 August 2011, after the resignation of Antonio Ceballos Atienza.

References

1949 births
Living people
Clergy from Madrid
Madrid Royal Conservatory alumni
Comillas Pontifical University alumni
Bishops of Cádiz y Ceuta
Spanish Roman Catholic bishops
Spanish Roman Catholic titular bishops
21st-century Roman Catholic titular bishops
21st-century Roman Catholic bishops in Spain
Bishops appointed by Pope Benedict XVI